2001 European Youth Olympic Festival may refer to:

2001 European Youth Summer Olympic Festival
2001 European Youth Olympic Winter Festival